Alamitornis is an extinct genus of basal ornithuromorph bird, possible within the family Patagopterygidae. Remains have been found in the Upper Cretaceous Los Alamitos Formation at Los Alamitos, Río Negro Province, Argentina. It was first named by Federico L. Agnolin and Agustín G. Martinelli in 2009 and the type species is Alamitornis minutus.

References 

Bird genera
Maastrichtian life
Cretaceous birds of South America
Late Cretaceous animals of South America
Cretaceous Argentina
Fossils of Argentina
 
Fossil taxa described in 2009
Prehistoric euornitheans